Clodfelter is a surname. Notable people with the surname include:

Dan Clodfelter (born 1950), American politician and attorney
Mark Clodfelter (born 1950), American politician
Melvin Clodfelter (1904–1983), American wrestler
Todd Clodfelter (born 1957), American politician